Tibillo District is one of five districts of the province Palpa in Peru.

References

1953 establishments in Peru
States and territories established in 1953